Carbon nanohoops are a class of molecules consisting of aromatic sections curved out of planarity by the inherent cyclic geometry of the molecule. This class of molecules came into existence with the synthesis of cycloparaphenylenes and since then has been expanded into cyclonaphthylenes, cyclochrysenylenes, and even cyclohexabenzocoronenylenes. Moreover, several nanohoops containing such antiaromatic units as dibenzo[a,e]pentalene and pyrrolo[3,2-b]pyrrole are reported. Carbon nanohoops often map on to a certain chirality of carbon nanotube. If the diameter is adequate, these molecules can host a fullerene. For example, [10]cycloparaphenylene can host a C60 fullerene.

References

Cyclophanes
Nanomaterials